American producer, songwriter, and multi-instrumentalist Mike Elizondo has worked with artists including 50 Cent, Eminem, Carrie Underwood, Fiona Apple, Mastodon, Ry Cooder, and Twenty One Pilots.  His songwriting credits include  "In Da Club" by 50 Cent, Eminem's "Just Lose It" and "The Real Slim Shady", "Family Affair" by Mary J. Blige, and Carrie Underwood's "Cowboy Casanova".

References 

Discographies of American artists